ISIS: Enemies of Humanity is a Hindi film based on terrorism. The backdrop of the film speaks volumes about the functioning of ISIS which is a terrorist group playing havoc across the globe. The film outlines the sheer importance of Islam in its purest form & defies the Islam which is projected by anti-social elements of the world.

Cast
 Yuvraj Kumar
 Harish Bhimani
 Manon Faure
 Rasheed Naz
 Rahul Dev

References

External links
 Now Available on Amazon Prime Video, USA
 

2017 films
2010s Hindi-language films
Films about Islamic State of Iraq and the Levant
Films about jihadism
Films about Islamic terrorism
Films about terrorism in India
Films set in the Middle East